The 1898 Sewanee Tigers football team represented Sewanee: The University of the South during the 1898 Southern Intercollegiate Athletic Association football season.  The team was coached by John Gere Jayne in his second year as head coach, compiling a record of 4–0 (3–0 SIAA) and outscoring opponents 56 to 4 to win the Southern Intercollegiate Athletic Association title. Due to misgivings over Virginia and North Carolina playing ringers, Caspar Whitney declared Sewanee the best team in the South.

Before the season
Sewanee was coming off the worst season in school history.

Schedule

Season summary

Nashville

Sources:

The season opened with a 10–0 victory to avenge last year's loss to the Nashville Garnet and Blue.

The starting lineup was Waites (left end), Jones (left tackle), Bolling (left guard), Risley (center), Claiborne (right guard), Smith (right tackle), Crandle (right end), Wilson (quarterback), Kilpatrick (left halfback), Gray (right halfback), Simkins (fullback).

Texas

Sources:

Sewanee beat Texas 4–0, scoring on a trick play.

The starting lineup was Waites (left end), Jones (left tackle), Risby (left guard), Poole (center), Claiborne (right guard), Smith (right tackle), Crandle (right end), Wilson (quarterback), Kilpatrick (left halfback), Gray (right halfback), Simkins (fullback).

Southern A. C.

Sources:

Sewanee defeated the Southern Athletic Club of New Orleans 21–0. A 12-yard run by Jones made the first touchdown. Davis made the next touchdown. He also scored the third, in the second half. Ormond Simkins made the last touchdown, racing for the goal after William H. Poole blocked a kick.

The starting lineup was Waites (left end), Jones (left tackle), Risby (left guard), Poole (center), Claiborne (right guard), Smith (right tackle), Crandell (right end), Wilson (quarterback), Kilpatrick (left halfback), Davis (right halfback), Simkins (fullback).

Vanderbilt

Sources:

The Tigers beat rival Vanderbilt 19–4. Sewell made the first touchdown on a 7-yard run. Vanderbilt's score came on a 40-yard run around left end by Walter H. Simmons. Simkins scored next on a 2-yard run. After the half, Kilpatrick scored on a 2-yard run. The last touchdown was a 35-yard run from Smith.

The starting lineup was Waites (left end), Jones (left tackle), Risley (left guard), Poole (center), Claiborne (right guard), Smith (right tackle), Davis (right end), Wilson (quarterback), Kilpatrick (left halfback), Siebels (right halfback), Simkins (fullback).

Postseason
Sewanee won the SIAA title.

Players

Varsity lettermen

Line

Backfield

Subs

References

Sewanee
Sewanee Tigers football seasons
College football undefeated seasons
Sewanee Tigers football